The Hudson-Kinahan Baronetcy, of Glenville in the Parish of Ardnageehy, Barony of Barrymore, in the County of Cork; of Wyckham in the Parish of Taney, Barony of Rathdown, Townland of Dundrum, in the County of Dublin; and of Merrion Square North in the City of Dublin, was a title in the Baronetage of the United Kingdom. It was created on 26 September 1887 for Edward Hudson-Kinahan, high sheriff for the city of Dublin in 1868 and of County Dublin in 1875. Born Edward Kinahan, he assumed the additional surname of Hudson the same year he was created a baronet. The title became extinct on the death of the third Baronet in 1949.

Hudson-Kinahan baronets, of Glenville, Wyckham and Merrion Square North (1887)
Sir Edward Hudson Hudson-Kinahan, 1st Baronet (1828–1892)
Sir Edward Hudson Hudson-Kinahan, 2nd Baronet (1865–1938)
Sir Robert Henry Hudson-Kinahan, 3rd Baronet (1872–1949)

References

Extinct baronetcies in the Baronetage of the United Kingdom